The 1953–54 NBA season was the Pistons' sixth season in the NBA and 13th season as a franchise.

The Pistons finished 40-32 (.556), 3rd in the Western Division.  The team advanced to the playoffs, losing in a Western Division round-robin 4-0 to the Minneapolis Lakers and the Rochester Royals.  The team was led on the season by center Larry Foust (15.1 ppg, 13.4 rpg, NBA All-Star), guard Andy Phillip (10.6 ppg, 6.3 apg, NBA All-Star), and first round draft choice Jack Molinas (11.6 ppg, 7.1 rpg, NBA All-Star).  

Molinas was named to the All-Star team, having played in 32 games before the league banned him for wagering on Pistons games. Molinas was then  suspended at the time of the All-Star game and was replaced by teammate Andy Phillip. He later sued the NBA for $3 million, claiming the league's ban was an unreasonable restraint of trade. Judge Irving Kaufman ruled against him in the case.

The Pistons had drafted future Hall of Famer George Yardley in 1950, but they didn’t sign him until 1953. Even then, it was a struggle, as Yardley reportedly hated training camp, rejected the initial Fort Wayne offer of $6,000, electing to playing beach volleyball in California.  Yardley this became the first rookie to hold out, until accepting an offer of $9,500, and then averaging 9.0 ppg in his NBA rookie season.

Regular season

Season standings

x – clinched playoff spot

Record vs. opponents

Game log

Playoffs

|- align="center" bgcolor="#ffcccc"
| 1
| March 16
| @ Rochester
| L 75–82
| George Yardley (20)
| Edgerton Park Arena
| 0–1
|- align="center" bgcolor="#ffcccc"
| 2
| March 18
| Minneapolis
| L 85–90
| Frankie Brian (20)
| War Memorial Coliseum
| 0–2
|- align="center" bgcolor="#ffcccc"
| 3
| March 20
| @ Minneapolis
| L 73–78
| Max Zaslofsky (15)
| Minneapolis Auditorium
| 0–3
|- align="center" bgcolor="#ffcccc"
| 4
| March 21
| Rochester
| L 71–89
| George Yardley (16)
| War Memorial Coliseum
| 0–4
|-

References

Detroit Pistons seasons
Fort Wayne